The Puerto Yeruá Formation is a Late Cretaceous geologic formation in the Paraná Basin, pertaining to Entre Ríos Province, Argentina. Dinosaur remains are among the fossils that have been recovered from the formation, as well as egg fragments and fossilized wood.

Description 
The formation comprises red claystones and grey sandstones, medium-thick, well silicified, partly conglomeratic, whitish and reddish color thanks to the presence of iron oxides and frequently calcareous cement. It was deposited in a lacustrine to floodplain humid environment with seasonal rainfall. Fossils of cf. Sphaerovum erbeni (Faveoloolithidae), Theropoda indet., and Ankylosauria indet. are reported from the formation. The formation has been correlated with the Guichón Formation of eastern Uruguay.

Paleofauna 
 Argyrosaurus superbus (lithostrotia indet.)
 Paraperseoxylon septatum

See also 
 List of dinosaur-bearing rock formations
 List of stratigraphic units with few dinosaur genera
 Guichón Formation

References

Bibliography 
 
 
  
 

Geologic formations of Argentina
Upper Cretaceous Series of South America
Cretaceous Argentina
Sandstone formations
Shale formations
Fluvial deposits
Lacustrine deposits
Ichnofossiliferous formations
Ooliferous formations
Fossiliferous stratigraphic units of South America
Paleontology in Argentina
Formations
Formations